Huasquillay is a town in the district of Omacha, province of Paruro, department of Cusco in Peru.
According to the 2017 National Censuses, it has a population of 141 inhabitants.

History
The town of Huasquillay was created on September 30, 1992, under municipal resolution No. 013, in the government of President Alberto Fujimori.

Geography
According to the floor
altitudinal belongs to the Quechua region.

Cultural traditions
Being agriculture and livestock the base of the family economy; we can find the production of corn, wheat, barley, potato in its various varieties, beans, peas, quinoa, squash, pumpkin and all kinds of vegetables, we can also find fruits from avocado, pears, medlar, capulí, prickly pear, apple, tumbo and others; within the livestock activity we find the breeding of Creole cattle, Brown Swiss, Holstein; we also find sheep, horses, pigs, etc.

During festivities there is a fondness for cockfighting, horse racing and bullfighting.

Authorities

Municipal 
 2021 - 2023
 Mayor: Alex Santiago Domínguez Puelles.
 Aldermen: 
 Eufemia Mollenido Billalobos
 Eduardo Huillca Mayta
 Victor Raúl Zoluaga Huamaní
 Encarnación Valverde Samanes
 Emiliano Games Montel

References 

1992 establishments in Peru
Populated places in the Cusco Region